The Yelan is a river in Voronezh Oblast of Russia. It is a right tributary of the Savala (in the drainage basin of the Don). It flows over the southern part of the Oka–Don Plain. Most of the rivers waters are from melting snow.

References 

Rivers of Voronezh Oblast